Praya East Reclamation Scheme was a large scale land reclamation project in Colonial Hong Kong lasting from 1921 to 1931 under Sir Catchick Paul Chater.

Proposal
The plan was first proposed while the existing Praya Reclamation Scheme was already active in 1897.  Construction did not start until 20 years later when the Royal Navy agreed to relocate the Naval hospital to Stonecutters Island.

Reclamation scheme
Construction work started at the junction of present-day Hennessy Road and Johnston Road to Percival Street.  The main goal was to relieve the population density in Victoria City.  The project ended up expanding Central to Wan Chai.

One of the reasons for the reclamation scheme was to provide an enhanced water supply.  A cross-harbour pipeline brought water all the way from the New Territories in 1930, the same year that the reclamation scheme was completed.

See also
 Central and Wan Chai Reclamation
 Land reclamation in Hong Kong
 Morrison Hill
 Wan Chai Police Station

References

Coastal construction in Hong Kong
Land reclamation
Wan Chai District